Bisatoceratidae is a family of Late Paleozoic ammonites now included in the Thalassoceratoidea characterized by thick-discoidal to subglobular, involute shells in which lobes are simple. Some forms have spiral ornamentation.

Bisatoceratidae was originally a subfamily of the Goniatitidae as Bisatoceratinae, named by Miller and Furnish, 1957, and introduced in the Treatise on Invertebrate Paleontology, Part L, 1957. Its relation to the Thalassoceratidae is tenuous.

References

Bisatoceratidae in GONIAT 6/14/12

 
Goniatitida families
Thalassoceratoidea